The women's 200 metres event at the 2007 World Championships in Athletics took place on 29–31 August (final) at the Nagai Stadium.

Having run the fastest time in the world this year, Allyson Felix entered as the favorite to retain her World Championship title. Her rival Veronica Campbell-Brown was her only threat from retaining her title.

In the final both Felix and Campbell-Brown shot out of the blocks like rockets, matching each other stride for stride, it was a bloody battle for the gold medal position. Coming into the straight, at the midpoint of the race, Veronica seemed to have a slight advantage over Allyson. Then Felix produced a display of speed and strength endurance that was simply astonishing, pulling away from the reigning olympic champion to win by a five-metre margin. Veronica and Susanthika Jayasinghe took second and third place respectively.

At just 19 years old Felix ran under 22 seconds for the first time, winning in 21.81 seconds (the only athlete to run under 22 seconds for this race) - this being the time of the Century at the time. Felix wrote herself into history and gave the world a glimpse of what was to come and would go on to be : one of the best track and field athletes in history - the most decorated track and field athlete ever!

Medalists

Records

Results

Heats
Qualification: First 4 in each heat(Q) and the next 8 fastest (q) advance to the quarterfinals.

Heat 1

Heat 2

Heat 3

Heat 4

Heat 5

Heat 6

Quarterfinals
First 4 of each Quarterfinal qualifies (Q).

Heat 1

Heat 2

Heat 3

Heat 4

Semifinals
First 4 of each Semifinal qualifies (Q).

Heat 1

Heat 2

Final 
31 August 2007

References
 Official results

Events at the 2007 World Championships in Athletics
200 metres at the World Athletics Championships
2007 in women's athletics